Eleni Kouvdou (born 9 August 1989) is a Greek water polo player. She was part of the Greek team that won the gold medal at the  2011 World Aquatics Championships.

See also
 List of world champions in women's water polo
 List of World Aquatics Championships medalists in water polo

References

External links
 

Greek female water polo players
Living people
Place of birth missing (living people)
1989 births
World Aquatics Championships medalists in water polo
Water polo goalkeepers
Water polo players from Athens
21st-century Greek women